Kurt Hilscher (1904–1980) was a German commercial illustrator. Hilscher studied in 1924–1926 at the Dresden Academy of Fine Arts under Max Frey and in 1926 under Franz von Stuck in Munich. He lived in Paris from 1927 to 1934 where he was influenced by the work of Ludwig Hohlwein, Jean Carlu, Ch. Loupot, P. Colin, and AM Cassandre.

References

German illustrators
1904 births
1980 deaths